Cody Walker may refer to:

 Cody Walker (poet) (born 1967), American poet
 Cody Walker (actor) (born 1988), American actor
 Cody Walker (rugby league) (born 1990), Australian rugby league player
 Cody Walker (rugby union) (born 1997), Australian rugby union player